This is a list of banks in Cuba which have been issued banking licences by the Central Bank of Cuba.

Commercial banks

Foreign banks

Havin Bank was founded as Havana International Bank Ltd. in 1973 with Banco Central de Cuba as a shareholder.

References 

Cuba
 
Banks
Cuba